The 2022 Copa Colombia, officially the Copa BetPlay Dimayor 2022 for sponsorship reasons, was the 20th edition of the Copa Colombia, the national cup competition for clubs affiliated to DIMAYOR, the governing body of professional club football in Colombia. The tournament, which was contested by 35 teams, began on 9 February 2022 and ended on 2 November 2022. 

Millonarios won their third title in the competition, after beating Junior in the double-legged final by a 2–1 aggregate score. As Copa Colombia champions, Millonarios qualified for the 2023 Copa Libertadores. Atlético Nacional were the defending champions, having won the competition in the previous edition, but were knocked out by Junior in the quarter-finals.

Format
The format for the 2022 Copa Colombia was similar to the one used in the previous two editions, with the competition being played in a double-legged, single-elimination format in its entirety, without any group stages. Fourteen out of the 15 Categoría Primera B teams entered the competition in the first stage and were drawn into seven ties, except for Boyacá Chicó who received a bye to the second stage for being the best-placed team in the aggregate table of the 2021–II Primera B tournament. After two stages, four Primera B teams qualified for the third stage, along with the 12 Categoría Primera A teams that failed to qualify for international competition, which entered the cup at that stage. Finally, in the round of 16, the eight third stage winners were joined by the four Copa Libertadores qualifiers (Deportes Tolima, Deportivo Cali, Millonarios, and Atlético Nacional) and the four Copa Sudamericana qualifiers (Junior, América de Cali, La Equidad, and Independiente Medellín), which entered the competition at this point.

Schedule 
The schedule of the competition was as follows:

First stage
The first stage was played by 14 Categoría Primera B clubs, eight of which were seeded in the ties according to their placement in the 2021–II season aggregate table. The remaining Primera B clubs were drawn into each tie. The seeded clubs (Team 2) hosted the second leg.

|}

First leg

Second leg

Second stage
The second stage was played by the seven first stage winners as well as Boyacá Chicó, who were seeded into this stage. In each tie, the clubs with the best performance in the first stage hosted the second leg.

|}

First leg

Second leg

Third stage
The third stage was played by the four second stage winners and the 12 Categoría Primera A clubs that did not qualify for international competition, which were seeded in the ties according to their placement in the 2021 season aggregate table. The four second stage winners as well as the four best teams according to the 2021 Primera A aggregate table hosted the second leg.

|}

First leg

Second leg

Final stages
Every round in the knockout stage was played in a home-and-away two-legged format. In each tie, the team which had the better overall record up to that stage hosted the second leg, except in the round of 16 where the third stage winners hosted the second leg. The teams entering the competition at this stage were the ones that qualified for the 2022 Copa Libertadores and 2022 Copa Sudamericana, which were drawn into each of the eight ties. In case of a tie, extra time was not played and the winner was decided in a penalty shoot-out.

Bracket

Round of 16
The teams qualifying from the third stage played the second leg at home.

|}

First leg

Second leg

Quarter-finals

|}

First leg

Second leg

Semi-finals

|}

First leg

Second leg

Finals

Millonarios won 2–1 on aggregate.

See also
 2022 Categoría Primera A season
 2022 Categoría Primera B season

References

External links 
  

Copa Colombia seasons
C